NGC 805 is a lenticular galaxy approximately 194 million light-years away from Earth in the constellation of Triangulum. It was discovered by German astronomer Heinrich Louis d'Arrest on September 26, 1864, with the 11-inch refractor at Copenhagen.

See also 
 List of NGC objects (1–1000)

References

External links 
 
 
 SEDS

Lenticular galaxies
Triangulum (constellation)
805
7899
Astronomical objects discovered in 1864
Discoveries by Heinrich Louis d'Arrest